Eva Speyer also known as Eva Speyer-Stoeckel and Eva Ebert (24 August 1882 – 13 August 1975) was a German actress. She appeared in more than seventy films from 1911 to 1932.

Selected filmography

References

External links 

1882 births
1975 deaths
German film actresses
German silent film actresses
20th-century German actresses
Actresses from Berlin